Grace International School (GIS;) is a small international school in Chiang Mai, Thailand that was founded in 1999 for the education of the children of Christian Missionaries living in the area. There are over 600 students from kindergarten through 12th grade, and these students represent a wide range of nationalities and ethnicities. Most of the students are TCK's (Third Culture Kids)  and so in addition to representing various countries, students  have a wide array of experiences living in countries as foreigners. The teachers are volunteers. 

GIS uses a US-based curriculum and most graduates go to the United States for higher education, although a large percentage move to the Republic of Korea (ROK), New Zealand, Australia, or remain in Thailand.

External links
 Grace International School

American international schools in Thailand
International schools in Chiang Mai
Educational institutions established in 1999
1999 establishments in Thailand